Mariya Karashka (born 4 August 1942) is a Bulgarian former artistic gymnast. She competed at the 1968 Summer Olympics. In the ranking of the 1000 best gymnasts of all time, she occupies the 736th position.

References

1942 births
Living people
Bulgarian female artistic gymnasts
Gymnasts at the 1968 Summer Olympics
Olympic gymnasts of Bulgaria
Gymnasts from Sofia